Gutierrez is a census-designated place (CDP) in Starr County, Texas, United States. This was a new CDP for the 2010 census with a population of 79.

Geography
Gutierrez is located at  (26.340046, -98.631564).

Education
It is in the Rio Grande City Grulla Independent School District (formerly Rio Grande City Consolidated Independent School District)

References

Census-designated places in Starr County, Texas
Census-designated places in Texas